The Suffolk Peanut Company is a historic peanut processing complex at 303 South Saratoga Street in Suffolk, Virginia.  The complex includes a number of warehouses dating from the first half of the 20th century, and a peanut processing plant dating back to 1932.  The site has been used for the processing, sorting, and storage of peanuts since about 1902.  It is believed to be the state's largest peanut processing operation.

The company property was added to the National Register of Historic Places in 2016.

See also
National Register of Historic Places listings in Suffolk, Virginia

References

Historic districts on the National Register of Historic Places in Virginia
Buildings and structures in Suffolk, Virginia
National Register of Historic Places in Suffolk, Virginia